Chilo agamemnon is a species of moth in the family Crambidae described by Stanisław Błeszyński in 1962. It is found in Spain, Egypt, Israel, Sudan and Uganda.

The wingspan is 16–19 mm. The ground colour of the forewings is dull yellow to pale dull yellow. The hindwings are lustrous cream greyish to silky white.

The larvae are a pest on Zea mays. They generally attack mature cane stalks, but have also been recorded feeding on young plants. The larvae pass through five to eight instars according to temperature variations.

References

Moths described in 1962
Chiloini